is a Japanese machine maker.  Originally, and still actively, a manufacturer of automatic looms, it is the company from which Toyota Motor Corporation developed.  It is the world's largest manufacturer of forklift trucks measured by revenues.

History

1920s 
The company was founded on 18 November 1926 as Toyoda Automatic Loom Works, Ltd. by Sakichi Toyoda, the inventor of a series of manual and machine-powered looms.  The most significant of these was the 1924 Toyoda Automatic Loom, Type G, a completely automatic high-speed loom featuring the ability to change shuttles without stopping and dozens of other innovations.  At the time it was the world's most advanced loom, delivering a clear improvement in quality and a twenty-fold increase in productivity.
In 2007, this machine was registered as item No. 16 in the Mechanical Engineering Heritage of Japan as "a landmark achievement that advanced the global textile industry and laid the foundation for the development of the Toyota Group."

1930s 
In 1933, the company established its automobile department, led by Kiichiro Toyoda, the eldest son of Sakichi Toyoda.  This department was spun off as Toyota Motor Co., Ltd. in 1937 and is now known as Toyota Motor Corporation.  Toyota Industries is one of 13 core companies of the Toyota Group. The company owns 8.48% of Toyota Motor and is the largest shareholder (excluding trust revolving funds). As a countermeasure against hostile merger and acquisition attempts, Toyota Motor currently holds 24.92% of common stock of its origin Toyota Industries.

1940s 
In 1940, the steel production department of Toyota Industries was spun off as Toyota Steel Works Ltd. (present Aichi Steel Corporation). In 1944, Toyota Industries's Obu plant, which produces castings, began operations. Five years later, the Toyota Industries stock was listed on the Tokyo, Osaka, and Nagoya Stock Exchanges.

1950s 
In 1952, Toyota Industries began producing press die for automobiles. One year later  the Kyowa plant began to assemble automobiles and produce engines. In 1956 Toyota unveiled the Model LA 1-ton lift truck, this was the company's first lift truck model. In 1957, Toyota Industries began producing D-type diesel engines. That same year, it launched the Model LAT .85-ton towing tractor. In the final year of the decade, Toyota Industries began producing the P-type gasoline engine.

1960s 
In 1960, the Kyowa plant was modified to only assemble lift trucks. That same year, the company began producing the shovel loader and three cylinder crank shaft type compressor. That same year, Toyota Industries' Development Laboratories and Toyota Central Research were established with funds from ten Toyota group companies. In 1964, Toyota Industries was recognized by Japan's Ministry of International trade and industry as one of the first Japanese companies to export. Toyota Industries also unveiled their new automated continuous spinning system. In 1967, the Toyota Publica entered into production at the company's Nagakusa plant. Toyota Industries had a monthly output of more than 1,000 units.

1970s 
In 1971, the company started assembling the Corolla. In 1973, Toyota Industries reached an output of 3,000 units. One year later, in 1974, production began on car air-conditioning compressors.

1980s 
In 1980, the company started producing the JA air. By 1984, the engine division of Toyota Industries was separated from the vehicle division. In 1986, Toyota Industries received the Deming Application prize for quality control implementation. In 1988 Toyota Industrial Equipment is created in Indiana, US.

1990s 
In 1991, Toyota Industries reached the landmark of 5 million units produced. A year later, it set up an Environmental Committee.

Current business

Toyota Industries is active in five business areas: automotive, materials handling, electronics, logistics, and textile machinery.

Toyota-branded forklifts from Toyota Industries share the same logo as Toyota automobiles from Toyota Motor Corporation and are manufactured at the Toyota Material Handling Inc. (TMH), previously known as Toyota Industrial Equipment Manufacturing (TIEM), facility in Columbus, Indiana, for the US market. 

Toyota Material Handling USA (TMHU) was formally a separate company, breaking out dealer and sales divisions of the North American business. Toyota Industrial Equipment Manufacturing (TIEM) was formally focused on engineering, manufacturing and responsible for the daily production of forklifts.  In 2018, these two divisions merged, combining the sales and manufacturing business functions into one business entity, now known as Toyota Material Handling Inc. (TMH).

Toyota Industries Corporation is under contract from Toyota Motor Corporation for the production of the Toyota RAV4. The company manufactures automotive engines for use in Toyota-branded automobiles such as Avensis, Corolla, Crown, and Land Cruiser.

In 2000, Toyota Industries acquired the Swedish-based forklift truck corporation BT Industries, alongside BT's subsidiaries The Raymond Corporation and CESAB. Combined with Toyota Industries' materials handling division, this created the largest forklift company in the world, Toyota Material Handling Corporation.

In October 2012, Toyota Industries acquired Cascade Corp., a maker of attachments for forklifts, for a price of $728 million.

In 2017, Toyota Industries acquired Vanderlande, a manufacturer of automated material handling equipment, mostly for airports.

Looms
In 2020, Toyota Industries was manufacturing two state-of-the-art looms: the JAT810 (air jet loom) and LWT810 (water jet loom). Both looms operate without shuttles. The water jet loom throws the weft through the warp threads using water, and thus can only be used with synthetic fibers. The air jet loom uses air to throw the weft, and thus can be use with any fiber.

Stock exchange 
The company's shares are traded on the Tokyo Stock Exchange under symbol 6201.T.

See also
 ST Liquid Crystal Display
 Toyota Industries SC, a football club
 Toyota Industries Shuttles Aichi, a rugby union club
 Toyota Industries Shining Vega, a Japanese women's softball team

References

External links
 Company website

Manufacturing companies established in 1926
Japanese companies established in 1926
Companies based in Aichi Prefecture
Companies listed on the Tokyo Stock Exchange
Forklift truck manufacturers
Textile machinery manufacturers
Toyota factories
Toyota Group